The 2013–14 Oral Roberts Golden Eagles women's basketball team represented Oral Roberts University during the 2013–14 NCAA Division I women's basketball season. The Golden Eagles were led by 2nd year head coach Misti Cussen and played their home games at the Mabee Center. The 2013–14 season was the Golden Eagles' final season in the Southland Conference.  Beginning with the 2014–15 season, the Golden Eagles will once again be competing in The Summit League after a two-year period as members of the Southland Conference.

Roster
Source

Schedule
Source

|-
!colspan=9| Regular Season

|-
!colspan=9| 2014 Southland Conference women's basketball tournament

See also
 2013–14 Oral Roberts Golden Eagles men's basketball team

References

Oral Roberts
Oral Roberts Golden Eagles women's basketball seasons
Oral
Oral